Harvest of Empire: The Untold Story of Latinos in America is a 2012 feature-length documentary film based on the book Harvest of Empire: A History of Latinos in America, written by journalist Juan González. The film was directed by Peter Getzels and Eduardo López, and premiered in New York and Los Angeles on September 28.

The film examines the role of the United States military and economic interests in Latin American countries. It documents the relationship between United States' intervention in the Dominican Republic, Guatemala, Nicaragua, and El Salvador, and the surge of migration from those nations. It links this exodus to the present massive Latino population in the United States. Also discussed are the wars fought by United States resulting in colonial expansion into Puerto Rico, Cuba, and over half of Mexico. It documents the covert actions by the United States to install dictatorships in the Dominican Republic, Guatemala, Nicaragua, and El Salvador.

The film features interviews with Nobel Prize winner Rigoberta Menchú, Jesse Jackson, executive director of the ACLU Anthony Romero, Junot Diaz, Lorenzo Meyer, Maria Hinojosa, Geraldo Rivera, musician Luis Enrique, Border Angels founder Enrique Morones and poet Martin Espada.

References

External links
 Official website
 Harvest of Empire: New Film Recounts How U.S. Intervention Caused Mass Latin American Migrations at Democracy Now! (Video)
 Harvest of Empire: New Book Exposes Latino History in America as Obama Campaigns for Latino Vote at Democracy Now! (Video)

2012 films
2012 documentary films
American documentary films
American independent films
Documentary films about American politics
Documentary films about revolutions
Documentary films about Latin America
2010s English-language films
2010s American films